Vejgaard is an eastern neighborhood of Aalborg, Denmark.

Neighbourhoods in Aalborg